Nicolas Izzillo (born 19 April 1994) is an Italian footballer who plays as a midfielder for  club Pontedera on loan from Pisa.

Club career
He made his Serie B debut for Spezia on 30 October 2012 in a game against Pro Vercelli.

On 21 January 2020 he signed with Avellino.

On 4 October 2020 he joined Casertana on loan.

On 31 August 2021, he was loaned to Trento. On 19 August 2022, Izzillo moved on loan to Pontedera.

References

External links
 

1994 births
Living people
People from La Maddalena
Footballers from Sardinia
Italian footballers
Association football midfielders
Serie B players
Serie C players
Spezia Calcio players
A.C. Bellaria Igea Marina players
A.C.R. Messina players
S.S. Ischia Isolaverde players
S.S. Juve Stabia players
Pisa S.C. players
U.S. Avellino 1912 players
Casertana F.C. players
A.C. Trento 1921 players
U.S. Città di Pontedera players